Philippe Tibeuf (born 12 June 1962) is a retired French football striker.

Honours

Monaco 

 1984-85 Coupe de France winner

External links
 Profile
 Profile

1962 births
Living people
French footballers
France international footballers
Association football forwards
En Avant Guingamp players
AS Monaco FC players
AS Saint-Étienne players
Ligue 1 players
People from Dinan
Footballers from Brittany
Sportspeople from Côtes-d'Armor
Brittany international footballers